DRTV International is the first private TV Channel in the Republic of the Congo, established on 28 November 2002.

See also
List of television stations in Africa

Television channels and stations established in 2002
Television stations in the Republic of the Congo